Dean Russell  (born 8 May 1976) is a British Conservative Party politician. He has been the Member of Parliament (MP) for Watford since the 2019 general election. He served as Parliamentary Under-Secretary of State for Enterprise and Markets from September to October 2022.

Early life
Russell is the son of Peter and Anne Russell, and was born in Birmingham. He attended Park Hall School in Castle Bromwich, before studying for a BSc in Physics and Business Studies and an MPhil in Physics and Material Science at the ex-polytechnic De Montfort University. He then worked in marketing, initially with Bluewave.

Political career
Russell stood for Parliament in Luton North in 2015 and Luton South in 2017, losing both times to incumbent Labour candidates. In 2019, he stood for election in Watford in 2019 after Conservative MP Richard Harrington decided not to stand for re-election in the seat. Russell was elected with a majority of 4,433 over Labour.

Since being elected, Russell has become a member of the Health & Social Care Select Committee and the Joint Committee on Human Rights. In October 2021, the Speaker of the House, Sir Lindsay Hoyle, appointed Russell as the Chair of the Speaker's Advisory Committee on Works of Art. In November 2021, he was appointed as Parliamentary Private Secretary (PPS) to the Foreign, Commonwealth & Development Office.

In June 2021, Russell presented the Tips Bill to Parliament. This bill would prohibit employers retaining tips and gratuities intended for staff and make provision about the division of tips and gratuities between staff. The bill was withdrawn before its Second Reading. In June 2022, after the Business Minister, Paul Scully MP, reassured Russell in Parliament that the UK Government would still support his bill, Russell presented the Employment (Allocation of Tips) Bill to Parliament. The bill was immediately granted a second reading in the House of Commons on 15 July 2022.

Between 2019 and 2021, Russell sat on the public committee during the committee stage of the Telecommunications (Security) Bill on its passage through the House of Commons. The Telecommunications (Security) Act 2021 was given royal assent on 17 November 2021. 

As an MP, Russell has been a strong advocate for mental health first aid. In a partnership with the Watford & West Herts Chamber of Commerce and a number of local community groups in Watford, Russell pledged to train one thousand people in Mental Health First Aid Awareness.

On 23 March 2021, Russell presented the First-Aid (Mental Health) Bill under the Ten Minute Rule in an attempt to change the law to make it compulsory for mental health first-aid to be in every workplace. The bill was designed to make mental health first-aid part of first-aid training requirements in workplaces as well as in wider society. If successful, employers and colleagues would play a part in spotting symptoms, signposting people to further help, or simply just listening. On 29 April, Parliament was prorogued, ending the Parliamentary session, and so the bill failed.

Personal life
He married Michelle in 2004; the couple have a daughter. According to Who's Who, his recreations are "painting, writing, playing the guitar" and "spending time with family".

Bibliography
Russell has written five books.

References

External links

1976 births
Living people
UK MPs 2019–present
Conservative Party (UK) MPs for English constituencies